Cotârgaci may refer to several places in Romania:

 Cotârgaci, a village in the commune Roma, Botoșani County
 Cotârgaci, a village in the commune Bălțați, Iași County
 Cotârgaci (river), a river in Botoșani County